Colonel John Harlan Amen (September 15, 1898 – March 10, 1960) was a lawyer and United States Army Intelligence officer, who served as Nuremberg Prison Chief Interrogator during the Nuremberg War Crimes Trials.

Early life and education 
John Harlan Amen was born on September 15, 1898 to Harlan Page Amen and Mary Rawson in Exeter, New Hampshire. He graduated from Phillips Exeter Academy in 1915, where his father had previously been principal, and from Princeton University in 1919. He attended Harvard Law School from 1919 to 1923.

Legal and political career 
He was admitted to the New York bar in 1923.  He served as an associate with Shearman & Sterling in New York from 1923 to 1928.

From 1928 to 1938, he was a partner in the firm of Duryee, Zunino, & Amen. In 1938, he was a partner in the firm Parker & Duryee.

He served as a special assistant to the United States Attorney General on cases involving anti-trust laws from 1928 to 1938.

On October 26, 1938, he was appointed as the special prosecutor to supersede the district attorney of Kings County in connection with investigation of official corruption in Brooklyn.

Amen served on the prosecution for the Murder Inc. killers. His investigation eventually led to the dismissal of nearly a dozen police officers for accepting fraudulent bonds.

Military career 
He served as a 2nd lieutenant in the United States Marine Corps Reserve Flying Corps.

By 1942, he was a lieutenant colonel with the United States Army.  He was promoted to colonel in 1944.

During the Nuremberg trials, he served as the Associate trial counsel, chief interrogations division office for the United States Chief of Counsel in war criminal trials at Nuremberg from 1945 to 1946.

Personal life 
He married Marion Cleveland Dell, the daughter of former President Grover Cleveland, on July 25, 1926.  John and Marion Amen had one son, Grover Cleveland.

Awards and honors
He received the Legion of Merit with Oak Leaf Cluster, the Order of St. Olav with rank of Commander from Norway, and the Order of the White Lion from Czechoslovakia.

Death 
Amen died on March 10, 1960.

Portrayal in popular culture
John Amen has been portrayed by the following actors in film, television and theater productions;
 David McIlwraith in the 2000 Canadian/U.S. T.V. production Nuremberg
Michael Fitzpatrick in the 2006 British television production Nuremberg: Goering's Last Stand
Tim Woodward in the 2006 BBC television docudrama Nuremberg: Nazis on Trial

References

External links

1898 births
1960 deaths
United States Army personnel of World War II
Harvard Law School alumni
Nuremberg trials
Princeton University alumni
Recipients of the Legion of Merit
Recipients of the Order of the White Lion
United States Army colonels
Phillips Exeter Academy alumni
United States Marine Corps officers